Itasca Independent School District is a public school district based in Itasca, Texas (USA) located in north central Hill County. Its mascot is a creature from American folklore, the Wampus Cat.

In addition to Itasca, the district also serves a portion of Carl's Corner.

In 2009, the school district was rated "exemplary" by the Texas Education Agency.

The Itasca Independent School district received national attention by invoking an indefinite suspension on student Kenneth Fails at the beginning of the 2010-2011 school year. He had been suspended for several weeks while in fifth grade in the 2009-2010 school year as well, both for refusing to cut his long hair.

Schools
Itasca High School
Itasca Middle School
Itasca Elementary School

References

External links
Itasca ISD
School Board Meets Over Boy's Long Hair

School districts in Hill County, Texas